Roberto Ivan Aguilar Gómez (born 19 May 1958 in La Paz, Bolivia) is a Bolivian economist, former university official, politician, and former Minister of Education from 2008 until 2019, when Evo Morales resigned. Aguilar served as docent, general secretary, and rector in the Universidad Mayor de San Andres in La Paz. In 2006, he was elected as a plurinominal member of the Bolivian Constituent Assembly for the Movement for Socialism and served as its vice president. In November 2008, he was appointed by Evo Morales as Minister of Education, succeeding Magdalena Cajías.

References

1958 births
Living people
Education ministers of Bolivia
People from La Paz
21st-century Bolivian politicians